The Battle of Groningen took place during the penultimate month of Second World War in Europe, from April 13 to 16, 1945, in the city of Groningen between a mixture of German soldiers, Dutch and Belgian SS troops numbering 7,000 against the entire 2nd Canadian Infantry Division, though the whole division was never in combat at any given time. There were also substantial amounts of Luftwaffe units manning flak guns in the area. Groningen was also the site of the headquarters for the Sicherheitsdienst in the North of the Netherlands. The German command structure was poor and the defenders had never exercised together.

The Canadian division, consisting of nine infantry battalions, a machine gun battalion, and a reconnaissance battalion, three combat engineer companies (Royal Canadian Engineers), was battle experienced with a proportion of partially trained reinforcements. Armour from the 10th Armoured Regiment (The Fort Garry Horse) and the 9th Armoured Regiment (The British Columbia Dragoons) was used in support.

German objectives
German soldiers fought to keep allied forces forces from liberating the city from Nazi control. Members of the Dutch SS, fighting alongside the German defenders, had reason to fear for their lives if they surrendered. The crimes of the SS were acutely known to the Canadians and Dutch, since the Malmedy massacre which took place only four months prior. The Germans hoped to use the city in order to cover the withdrawal of forces from Friesland to Germany, in addition to defending the Ems entrance into Germany. Defending Ems was especially important for the Germans because the Kriegsmarine still used Emden as a port for surface vessels and U-boats.

Allied objectives
Wary of advancing into the western Netherlands and incurring heavy casualties (as well as losses to the densely packed civilian population) at a late stage of the war (fighting in Langstraat and Betuwe showed that conditions were very favourable to the defence), the First Canadian Army instead moved northeast, supporting the flank of the British 2nd Army as they entered Germany proper.

Battle
German forces were mainly deployed in the ancient city centre shielded in part by an ancient canal. Some troops were deployed in the southern suburbs. A German pocket in the power station surrendered after the fall of the inner city. The inner city was reached on 14 April.

Western approaches to the old town were blocked because the bridges over the canal were destroyed. The Herebrug bridge in the south of the old town was not destroyed, but it took a day before the Germans with machine guns were defeated in the buildings north of a circular 'circus' on the north side of the bridge. The Canadians managed to enter the north of the city centre, Nieuwe Stad, after two hours of fighting in the Noorderplantsoen park, which was placed where the city walls used to be in the 19th century and before.

The fight in the central market square, Grote markt, was the fiercest part of the battle. There were several German machine guns in the buildings north of the square. The buildings had to be destroyed by tanks. The Nieuwe Stad was conquered, but the Canadians could not reach the Oude Stad from the north, due to fierce German resistance.

The German commander surrendered on 16 April once it was clear further resistance was useless.

The Canadians used armour effectively in co-operation with their infantry. Artillery support was forbidden out of fear of harming the civilian population.

Result
The death toll included approximately 130 Germans, 43 Canadians, and 100 Dutch civilians. Some 270 buildings were damaged or destroyed in the fighting. Over 5,200 Germans surrendered (including 95 officers) and the remaining Germans (about 2,000) fled northeast, and the 2nd Division again met them in battles such as the Battle of Grüppenbühren near Delmenhorst.

Significance
Groningen was one of the largest urban battles of the war for the Canadian Army; while Ortona was made famous by news reports referring to it as "Little Stalingrad", Groningen involved five times as many Canadian soldiers in direct combat.

References

 Ashworth, G. J., The city as Battlefield. The Liberation of Groningen, April 1945 (Groningen 1995).

External sources
 www.calgaryhighlanders.com
 www.canadiansoldiers.com: "Groningen"

Urban warfare
Western European Campaign (1944–1945)
Battles of World War II involving Canada
Battles of World War II involving Germany
Battles and operations of World War II involving the Netherlands
Battle of Groningen
April 1945 events in Europe
Groningen
Battle of Groningen
Events in Groningen (city)